Hamipur High School, established in 1947, is one of the oldest schools in Odisha, India. This educational institute is for boys from class VI to class X. It is located at Hamirpur, Rourkela near Hamirpur Catholic Cathedral Church. The school is administered by the Catholic Education Board of Rourkela and is affiliated to Board of Secondary Education, Odisha.

History
Hamipur High School was first established by Jesuit missionaries of Gangpur Mission for the social, economical, and political empowerment of tribals of Odisha. For the establishment of this school, Bishop Servin of Ranchi appointed Fr. Joseph Peter Tigga as Headmaster. School was opened on 24 June 1947 for class VIII with thirty students in Hamirpur. After independence of India on 15 August 1947 Gangpur was merged with Odisha. In 1948 class 9th was opened, and in 1949 classes 8th and 9th were recognized. In the same year, class 10th was added, and 11th was added the next year. In 1951 the first batch of students passed the matriculation examination.

Initially the school was named Rajeswar High School, but the state school authority didn't accept the name, so it was finally named as Hamirpur High School in 1951.

Courses offered
The school offers middle and secondary education from Classes VI to X. The School prepares the students for HSC examinations for Board of Secondary Education Odisha.

External links
 Hamirpur High School at Google+
 Map

Catholic secondary schools in India
Boys' schools in India
Christian schools in Odisha
High schools and secondary schools in Odisha
Schools in Rourkela
Educational institutions established in 1947
1947 establishments in India